The 2007 Tal Afar bombings took place on March 27, 2007, when two truck bombs targeted Shia areas of the Turkmen town of Tal Afar, Iraq, killing 152 and wounding 347 people.

References

External links
Gunmen kill dozens in Iraqi town

2007 murders in Iraq
Massacres in 2007
Massacres in Iraq
Suicide car and truck bombings in Iraq
Terrorist incidents in Iraq in 2007
Violence against Shia Muslims in Iraq
March 2007 events in Iraq
March 2007 crimes